Undercover is the second single taken from the second album The Roads Don't Love You by Irish singer-songwriter Gemma Hayes, released in 2006 on the Source Records label.

Background
This was the last single released through her Virgin EMI record deal. Following a re-organisation of the label Virgin EMI decided to reduce the physical release of the single only to Ireland, where it was released through EMI Ireland. Shortly after Virgin EMI and Gemma Hayes parted ways.

Live Performance
Hayes performed the track on RTÉ One's Turbidy Tonight on 11 February 2006. She also performed the single on RTÉ 2's The Cafe.

She would also perform the track at Abbey Road which later featured on the interactive digital release.

Track listing

CD 1
All songs written by Gemma Hayes.
 "Undercover"
 "Perfect Day"

CD 2 (Enhanced CD)
 "Undercover"
 "Bless The Boy"
 "Something In My Way (Live Acoustic Version - live at Abbey Rd)"
 "Something In My Way (Live Acoustic Version - Video - live at Abbey Rd)"

7"
 "Undercover"
 "Bless The Boy"

Charts

References

2002 songs
Gemma Hayes songs
Songs written by Jeff Trott
Songs written by Gemma Hayes